This is a list of international visits undertaken by John Kerry (in office 2013–2017) while in the role of United States Secretary of State. The list includes both private travel and official state visits. The list includes only foreign travel which he made during his tenure in the position.

Summary 
The number of visits per country or territory where Secretary Kerry traveled are:
 One visit to Angola, Antarctica, Australia, Bahrain, Bangladesh, Bulgaria, Cambodia, Chile, Congo, Cyprus, Denmark, Djibouti, Dominican Republic, Greece, Greenland, Guatemala, Haiti, Kazakhstan, Kosovo, Kyrgyzstan, Lebanon, Lithuania, Luxembourg, Mexico, Moldova, Mongolia, Netherlands, New Zealand, Norway, Rwanda, Serbia, Singapore, Solomon Islands, Somalia, South Sudan, Spain, Sri Lanka, Sweden, Tajikistan, Turkmenistan and Uzbekistan 
 Two visits to Brazil, Brunei, Cuba, Ethiopia, Georgia, Ireland, Kazakhstan, Kuwait, Laos, Malaysia, Morocco, Myanmar, Pakistan, Panama, Peru, Philippines and Tunisia
 Three visits to Colombia, Indonesia, Japan, Nigeria, Oman, Poland, Qatar, South Korea, Ukraine and Vatican City
 Four visits to Canada, India, Iraq and Vietnam
 Five visits to Afghanistan and Russia 
 Six visits to Turkey
 Seven visits to United Arab Emirates 
 Nine visits to China
 Ten visits to Austria
 Eleven visits to Egypt and Germany
 Twelve visits to Belgium, Italy and the Palestinian National Authority
 Thirteen visits to Israel
 Fourteen visits to Jordan
 Seventeen visits to Saudi Arabia
 Twenty visits to Switzerland
 Twenty-eight visits to the United Kingdom
 Thirty-four visits to France

Table

References

2013 beginnings
2017 endings
2010s in international relations
2010s politics-related lists
United States Secretary of State
S
John Kerry
United States diplomacy-related lists
|Kerry
2010s timelines